Admiral Kaas may refer to:

Frederik Christian Kaas (1725–1803), Royal Dano-Norwegian Navy admiral
Frederik Christian Kaas (1727–1804), Royal Dano-Norwegian Navy admiral
Ulrich Kaas (1677–1746), Royal Dano-Norwegian Navy admiral